Gefion Gymnasium is an upper secondary school (Danish: gymnasium) in Copenhagen, Denmark. It is located on Øster Voldgade in the city centre.

History
Gefion Gymnasium was created in 2010 through the merger of Østre Borgerdyd Gymnasium and the Metropolitan School.

Building
The buildings were originally constructed for the College of Advanced Technologies. The complex was designed by Oluf Gjerløv-Knudsen and constructed between 1929 and 1954. It has a total area of 12,000 square metres. The rear side faces Rigensgade (No. 18) and the northeast side Stokhusgade (Nos. 1–5). Geocenter Danmark, a research centre under the University of Copenhagen, is also based in the buildings.

References

External links
 Official website

Gymnasiums in Copenhagen
2010 establishments in Denmark
Educational institutions established in 2010